Kolon may refer to:
 Kolon Industries, a Korean company
 Kolon, Chad, a sub-prefecture of Chad

See also 
 Abba Kolon, a figure in Talmudic mythology
 Ali Kolon, 15th-century Songhai king
 Colon (disambiguation)
 Kollon
 Kolong (disambiguation)